"Shake the Sugar Tree" is a song written by Chapin Hartford, and recorded by American country music singer Pam Tillis.  It was released in August 1992 as the lead-off single from her album Homeward Looking Angel.  "Shake the Sugar Tree" became Tillis' fourth Top Ten country hit, peaking at number 3 on Billboard Hot Country Singles & Tracks (now Hot Country Songs).

Content
In the song, a wife admonishes her husband for taking her and their relationship for granted too often, only responding when she threatens to leave ("You're like fruit from a fickle vine, you turn sweet in the nick of time / Love, you only come alive when you're losin' me") and concluding that sometimes she has to "shake the sugar tree" (provoke him) in order to "feel his love come falling all around [her]".

Singer-songwriter Stephanie Bentley sang the demo version of the song, and Tillis' producer, Paul Worley, incorporated Bentley's demo vocals as harmony vocals in the final recording.

Critical reception
Roch Parisien and Thom Jurek, who reviewed Homeward Looking Angel for Allmusic, cited the song as a standout on the album, calling it "sultry and sexy."

Chart positions

Year-end charts

References

1992 singles
Pam Tillis songs
Song recordings produced by Paul Worley
Arista Nashville singles
Music videos directed by Steven Goldmann
Songs written by Chapin Hartford
1992 songs